Gerald Zimmermann (born January 16, 1973) is an Aruban football player. He has played for Aruba national team.

National team statistics

References

1973 births
Living people
Aruban footballers
Association football midfielders
SV Britannia players
SV Dakota players
Aruba international footballers